Hurstpierpoint & Bolney is an electoral division of West Sussex in the United Kingdom, and returns one member to sit on West Sussex County Council.

Extent
The division is one of the largest in West Sussex, covering the villages of Albourne, Bolney, Fulking, Hickstead, Hurst Wickham, Hurstpierpoint, Newtimber, Poynings, Pyecombe, Sayers Common, Slaugham and Warninglid.

It comprises the following Mid Sussex District wards: Bolney Ward and Hurstpierpoint & Downs Ward; and of the following civil parishes: Albourne, Bolney, Fulking, Hurstpierpoint & Sayers Common, Newtimber, Poynings, Pyecombe, the southern part of Slaugham, and Twineham.

Election results

2017 Election
Results of the election held on 4 May 2017:

2013 Election
Results of the election held on 2 May 2013:

2009 Election
Results of the election held on 4 June 2009:

2005 Election
Results of the election held on 5 May 2005:

References
Election Results - West Sussex County Council

External links
 West Sussex County Council
 Election Maps

Electoral Divisions of West Sussex